À Tâtons is the second album by the Belgian singer Axelle Red. It was released in 1996.

Singles taken from À Tâtons were "Rien Que d'y Penser", "À Tâtons", "Rester Femme", "À Quoi Ca Sert" and "Ma Prière".

Track listing

 "À Tâtons" (Axelle Red, Albert Hammond, Shelly Peiken) – 3:30
 "C'était" (Red, Hammond, Peiken) – 4:07
 "Mon Café" (Red) – 4:37
 "Ma Prière" (Red) – 4:44
 "Pas si naïf" (Red, Christophe Vervoort) – 3:42
 "À quoi ça sert" (Red, Vervoort) – 3:36
 "Papa dit" (Red, Patrick Deltenre, Vervoort) – 4:58
 "Qui connaît la route" (Richard Seff, Red) – 3:30
 "Rien que d'y penser" (Red, Hammond, Peiken) – 3:06
 "T'en fais pas pour moi" (Red, S. Cropper, C. Marsh) – 5:10
 "Rester Femme" (Red) – 5:02
 "Légère" (R. Seff, Red) – 3:55
 "Un Été pour rien" (R. Seff, Daniel Seff, Red) – 3:30
 "À Tâtons (reprise)"  – 7:32

Charts

Certifications

References

1996 albums
Axelle Red albums
Virgin Records albums